Luc Sevenhans (born 6 September 1954, in Brasschaat) is a Belgian politician and is affiliated to the N-VA and formerly to Vlaams Belang until 2009. He was member of the Chamber of Representatives from 1997 until 2010 and member of the Belgian Senate from 2010 until 2012. From 2003 to 2010 he was also member of the Benelux Parliament.

He is the municipal councillor of Brasschaat since 1989.

Notes

1954 births
Living people
Members of the Senate (Belgium)
New Flemish Alliance politicians
People from Brasschaat
21st-century Belgian politicians